"Mon cœur fait boom boom" is a song by French virtual singer Marilou from her boyfriend Pinocchio's debut album, Mon Alboum! (2005). Released as the fourth single from that album in March 2006, the song reached number 33 in France.

Track listing

Charts

References

External links 
 

2005 songs
2006 singles
Pinocchio (singer) songs
EMI Music France singles